Hermann II (28 March 1222 in Creuzburg – 3 January 1241) was the Landgrave of Thuringia and the son of Louis IV, Landgrave of Thuringia, and Saint Elizabeth of Hungary.

Life 

With Louis's death in 1227, his brother Henry Raspe assumed the regency due to the minority of four-year-old Hermann. Henry managed to officially succeed his brother after the death of Elizabeth in 1231. Hermann never reigned and died ten years later; some historians have accused Henry of poisoning the youth. He was married to Helen, daughter of Otto I, Duke of Brunswick-Lüneburg.

References

Bibliography 
 
 
 
 
 

1222 births
1241 deaths
People from Wartburgkreis
Rulers of Thuringia
Monarchs deposed as children
Medieval child monarchs
Landgraves of Thuringia
Ludovingians